Hipparchia fagi, the woodland grayling, is a butterfly of the family Nymphalidae.

Etymology
The Latin species name fagi, meaning of "beech" (=fagus), refers to the prevailing species of trees in the relating biotope.

Subspecies
 Hipparchia fagi tetrica Fruhstorfer, 1907

Distribution and habitat
This widespread European endemic species can be found in most of Europe, mainly south of the Alps (Albania; Andorra; Austria; Bosnia and Herzegovina; Bulgaria; Croatia; Czech Republic; France; Germany; Greece; Hungary; Italy; Macedonia; Montenegro; Portugal; Romania; Russia; Serbia; Slovakia; Slovenia; Spain; Switzerland; Ukraine). It occurs on broad-leaved deciduous forests, coniferous woodland, grassy vegetation, in woodland glades and woodland rides and, from sea level to 1,600 m elevation.

Description 

These large butterflies have dark brown uppersides of the wings, with a fringed margin, a white submarginal band more evident in the females and one black eyelet at the apex of each forewings. In the males the white band has a single very small eyelet on each hindwing, sometimes showing a white pupil, while in the females it shows one or two ocelli.

The underside of the forewings is rather similar to the upperside: The hindwings are marbled of brown and white with a broad white band. The white band on the internal edge of the underside hindwings is curved, while the white band on the underside forewings is often without a significant indent.

The colouration and pattern of these butterflies are an excellent camouflage on the bark of the trunks where the butterfly usually rests, with the eyespots hidden by the closed wings. This species is similar but larger than Hipparchia hermione. It is also rather similar to Hipparchia syriaca and Hipparchia genava.

The caterpillar has a pale brown head with four darker streaks. Body is light brown with a bifid posterior end, a dark brown dorsal band and brownish lateral bands.

Biology 
Adults fly from June to September. This species has one generation a year. The caterpillars overwinter. The larvae feed on various types of grass, such as Brachypodium pinnatum, Bromus erectus, Festuca rubra, Holcus lanatus and Holcus mollis.

Bibliography
Kudrna, O. (1977): A Revision of the Genus Hipparchia Fabricius. — 300 S., Faringdon – London
Kudrna, O., Harpke, A., Lux, K., Pennerstorfer, J., Schweiger, O., Settele, J. & M. Wiemers (2011): Distribution atlas of butterflies in Europe. – 576 S.; Halle a.d. Saale
Lionel G. Higgins et Norman D. Riley, Guide des papillons d'Europe, Delachaux et Niestlé, 1988, (Lausanne).
Tom Tolman, Richard Lewington, Guide des papillons d'Europe et d'Afrique du Nord, Delachaux et Niestlé,.

References

External links

 Paolo Mazzei, Daniel Morel, Raniero Panfili Moths and Butterflies of Europe and North Africa
 Larvae of North-European
 Lepiforum.de

Hipparchia (butterfly)
Butterflies described in 1763
Butterflies of Europe
Taxa named by Giovanni Antonio Scopoli